Lake Fenton is a census-designated place (CDP) in Fenton Charter Township, Genesee County in the U.S. state of Michigan. As of the 2010 census the population was 5,559, up from 4,876 at the 2000 census. The CDP includes the unincorporated communities of Bayport Park and Lakeside.

The Lake Fenton Community Schools district overlaps a portion of this and adjacent areas. The school district and community are named after Lake Fenton, formerly known as Long Lake. A community was platted as "Mount Pleasant" by John Cook in 1840, with a second plat added in 1845. The name was changed to "Long Lake" in 1850, and a post office with that name opened on March 6, 1851. The lake was subsequently renamed "Lake Fenton", and the platted settlement became extinct. In 1932, the United States Board on Geographic Names decided on "Lake Fenton" as the official name of the lake.

Astronaut Michael J. Bloomfield grew up in Lake Fenton (his address was officially Linden, Michigan, and he was born in Flint).

Communities

Geography 
The Lake Fenton CDP occupies the northeast corner of Fenton Township, bordered to the north by Mundy Township, to the west by the rest of Fenton Township, to the south by the city of Fenton, and to the east by Holly Township in Oakland County. All but the southern end of Lake Fenton, the water body, is located within the Lake Fenton CDP; the southern end of the lake is in the city of Fenton. Other lakes in the CDP include Petts Lake, Crooked Lake, McCully Lake, Dollar Lake, Little Long Lake, and Barnum Lake.

Demographics

As of the census of 2000, there were 4,876 people, 1,886 households, and 1,433 families residing in the CDP. The racial makeup of the CDP was 97.09% White, 0.25% Black or African American, 0.45% Native American, 0.66% Asian, 0.02% Pacific Islander, 0.27% from other races, and 1.27% from two or more races. 1.39% of the population were Hispanic or Latino of any race.

There were 1,886 households, out of which 31.2% had children under the age of 18 living with them, 64.8% were married couples living together, 7.2% had a female householder with no husband present, and 24.0% were non-families. 19.5% of all households were made up of individuals, and 6.2% had someone living alone who was 65 years of age or older. The average household size was 2.58 and the average family size was 2.97.

In the CDP, the population was spread out, with 23.6% under the age of 18, 7.1% from 18 to 24, 29.0% from 25 to 44, 29.2% from 45 to 64, and 11.1% who were 65 years of age or older. The median age was 40 years. For every 100 females there were 102.7 males. For every 100 females age 18 and over, there were 102.0 males.

The median income for a household in the CDP was $67,885, and the median income for a family was $82,366. Males had a median income of $54,559 versus $32,804 for females. The per capita income for the CDP was $32,717. 3.2% of the population and 1.0% of families were below the poverty line. Out of the total population, 1.1% of those under the age of 18 and 4.7% of those 65 and older were living below the poverty line.

References

Unincorporated communities in Genesee County, Michigan
Populated places established in 1840
1840 establishments in Michigan
Census-designated places in Genesee County, Michigan
Census-designated places in Michigan
Unincorporated communities in Michigan